Aaron Rai (born 3 March 1995) is an English professional golfer who plays on the PGA Tour and the European Tour. He has won twice on the European Tour; the 2018 Honma Hong Kong Open and the 2020 Aberdeen Standard Investments Scottish Open. He is one of the few professional golfers to wear two gloves.

Professional career
Rai turned professional in 2012. In 2014 and 2015 he played on the PGA EuroPro Tour. He won the 2015 Glenfarclas Open after a playoff, finished 5th in the Order of Merit and was promoted to the Challenge Tour for 2016.

Rai was 18th in the 2016 Challenge Tour Order of Merit and just missed out on a European Tour place. His best finish was joint runner-up in the Le Vaudreuil Golf Challenge, a stroke behind the winner, Alexander Björk.

2017 was a successful season with Rai, with three wins on the Challenge Tour. In March he won the Barclays Kenya Open by 3 strokes. His Kenya-born mother embraced him on the final green, seconds after his final stroke: Rai said that it was her first visit to Kenya since she left in 1970. He had his second win in May, the Andalucía Costa del Sol Match Play 9, beating Irishman Gavin Moynihan 2&1 in the 9-hole final. His third success came in July in the Le Vaudreuil Golf Challenge where he won by 5 strokes. The third win gave him an immediate entry to the European Tour. In May, at Walton Heath, he led international section qualifying for the U.S. Open but failed to make the cut in his first major.

In his first season on the European Tour Rai had four top-10 finishes and ended the 2018 season 58th in the Order of Merit. His highest finish was tied for 5th place in the BMW International Open and he was 8th in the Nedbank Golf Challenge in November.

Rai won the 2018 Honma Hong Kong Open, the first event of the 2019 European Tour season. He led by 6 strokes after three rounds but was pushed hard by Matt Fitzpatrick, who finished with a final round 64. Rai's lead had been reduced to one shot after 16 holes but Fitzpatrick bogeyed the 17th and, despite a bogey at the last hole, Rai won by one.

In September 2020, Rai held the 54-hole lead at the Dubai Duty Free Irish Open, but was unable to convert this into a victory as John Catlin overtook him by two shots; ultimately finishing runner-up. A week later, Rai defeated Tommy Fleetwood in a playoff to win the Aberdeen Standard Investments Scottish Open, a result that lifted him into the world top 100 for the first time.

In August 2021, Rai entered the Albertsons Boise Open as part of the Korn Ferry Tour Finals in a way of obtaining a PGA Tour card for the 2021–22 season. He held a one-shot lead on the final hole of the tournament, however a closing double-bogey saw him drop to a tie for second-place, one shot behind Greyson Sigg. The result was still good enough for Rai to secure his card for the following season. In the third round of the 2023 Players Championship, Rai scored a hole-in-one on the signature 17th island green.

Professional wins (6)

European Tour wins (2)

1Co-sanctioned by the Asian Tour

European Tour playoff record (1–0)

Challenge Tour wins (3)

PGA EuroPro Tour wins (1)

Results in major championships
Results not in chronological order in 2020.

CUT = missed the halfway cut
NT = No tournament due to COVID-19 pandemic

Results in The Players Championship

"T" indicates a tie for a place

Results in World Golf Championships

1Cancelled due to COVID-19 pandemic

NT = No tournament
"T" = Tied

See also
2017 Challenge Tour graduates
2021 Korn Ferry Tour Finals graduates
List of golfers to achieve a three-win promotion from the Challenge Tour

References

External links

English male golfers
European Tour golfers
PGA Tour golfers
Sportspeople from Wolverhampton
English people of Kenyan descent
1995 births
Living people